German submarine U-712 was a Type VIIC U-boat built for Nazi Germany's Kriegsmarine for service during World War II. Commissioned on 5 November 1942, she served with the 8th U-boat Flotilla until 31 October 1943 as a training boat, and as a front boat in the 3rd U-boat Flotilla under Oberleutnant zur See Walter Pietschmann until 14 December, before being replaced by Oberleutnant zur See Walter-Ernst Koch.

Design
German Type VIIC submarines were preceded by the shorter Type VIIB submarines. U-712 had a displacement of  when at the surface and  while submerged. She had two shafts and two  propellers.

U-712 was fitted with five  torpedo tubes (four fitted at the bow and one at the stern), fourteen torpedoes, one  SK C/35 naval gun, 220 rounds, and two twin  C/30 anti-aircraft guns. The boat had a complement of between forty-four and sixty.

Service history
Built as yard number 778 at the HC Stülcken & Sohn shipyard in Hamburg, U-712 was launched on 10 August 1942. After the completion of system checks and crew training, U-712 was transferred to the 3rd Flotilla on 1 November 1943. On 1 January 1944, she was reassigned to the 21st U-boat Flotilla as a training boat. On 3 July 1944, Oberleutnant zur See Koch handed over to Freiherr Eberhard von Ketelhodt, leaving to command . U-712s purpose was succeeded by a similar function with the 31st from 1 March 1945.

In the rest of her career under Walter-Ernst Koch and Freiherr Eberhard von Ketelhodt, she served as a training vessel, never having made a single patrol.

Fate
After Germany's surrender in May 1945, U-712 was surrendered at Kristiansand on 9 May 1945 in Norway. She was later taken to Loch Ryan in Scotland, where the British used her bulk for testing before breaking her up at Hayle in 1950.

References

Bibliography

External links

1942 ships
U-boats commissioned in 1942
World War II submarines of Germany
Ships built in Hamburg
U-boats scuttled in 1945
German Type VIIC submarines